The year 1897 in archaeology involved some significant events.

Explorations
 Rudolf Ernst Brünnow and Alfred von Domaszewski begin a two-year expedition to the Arabian Peninsula, including Petra.

Excavations
 Excavation of Glastonbury Lake Village by Arthur Bulleid and Harold St George Gray begins.
 Maud Cunnington carries out her first excavations in the Devizes area of England.
 Excavation of the first Mycenaean chamber tombs in Kolonaki at Thebes, Greece, by Dimitrios Filios.
 Excavation of Nekhen in Egypt begins (continues to 1899).
 Excavation of Susa in Iran by a French expedition led by Jacques de Morgan begins (continues to 1911).

Finds
 May - Yde Girl, a bog body, is discovered in the village of Yde, The Netherlands.
 August 4 - The "Lady of Elche" Iberian sculpture (4th century BCE) is found at L'Alcúdia near Elche in Spain.
 Coligny calendar.
 Alekanovo inscription.
 Silver and gold tubes of the Maykop culture from a burial mound in Armenia, interpreted in 2022 as drinking straws for communal beer consumption.

Events
 February 18 - Conclusion of the Benin Expedition of 1897, leading to the Benin Bronzes being carried off to London.

Publications
 William Copeland Borlase - The Dolmens of Ireland: their distribution, structural characteristics, and affinities in other countries, together with the folklore attaching to them; supplemented by considerations on the anthropology, ethnology, and traditions of the Irish people (3 vols, London).

Births
 June 1 - Yang Zhongjian, father of Chinese vertebrate paleontology (d. 1979).
 August 21 - Victor Erle Nash-Williams, Welsh archaeologist (d. 1955).
 October 30 - Einar Gjerstad, Swedish archaeologist of the ancient Mediterranean (d. 1988).

Deaths
 May 5 - James Theodore Bent, English explorer, archaeologist and author (b. 1852).
 May 21 - Augustus Wollaston Franks, English antiquarian (b. 1826).

References

Archaeology, 1897 In
Archaeology by year
1890s in science
Archaeology, 1897 In